Hildegard Hansen "Hilde" Nissen (6 May 1921, Frankfurt am Main – 4 November 2015, Copenhagen) was a Danish former sprinter who competed in the 1948 Summer Olympics.

References

1921 births
2015 deaths
Danish female sprinters
Olympic athletes of Denmark
Athletes (track and field) at the 1948 Summer Olympics
Olympic female sprinters